Mistral Engines SA is a Swiss firm formed in 2001 with the purpose of developing engines for light aircraft and helicopters.  Its headquarters is in Geneva, Switzerland and is majority owned by DEA General Aviation, a Chinese company based in Guangdong. A wholly owned subsidiary company is headquartered in DeLand, Florida.

Product line
Mistral G-190
Mistral G-230-TS
Mistral G-360-TS
Mistral G-300 - a three-rotor wankel engine rated at 300 hp (224 kW) in normally aspirated configuration and at 360 hp (269 kW) with optional turbocharging
Mistral K-300 - similar to the G-300 but configured to use kerosene (jet fuel) instead of gasoline
Mistral G-200 - a two-rotor wankel engine rated at 200 hp (149 kW) in normally aspirated configuration and at 230 hp (172 kW) with optional turbocharging
Mistral K-200 - similar to the G-200 but configured to use kerosene (jet fuel) instead of gasoline

References

External links 
Company history

Aircraft engine manufacturers of Switzerland
Manufacturing companies of Switzerland